After the end of Operation Desert Storm/Shield, the US Army inactivated many units.  The units fighting the War on Terrorism are the survivors of the "Peace Dividend".  While additional fighting brigades are being created, no additional deployable higher headquarters units are planned. This list is not comprehensive as it only includes active-duty formations under the divisional structure. There are many Reserve, National Guard, and support units not included or referenced here.

Armies 
 First Army
 Eighth Army
 United States Army Central 
 United States Army Cyber
 United States Army Europe
 United States Army North 
 United States Army Pacific
 United States Army South

Corps
 I Corps
 III Corps
 V Corps
 XVIII Airborne Corps

Divisions
 1st Infantry Division (The Big Red One)
 1st Cavalry Division (The First Team)
 1st Armored Division (Old Ironsides) 
 2d Infantry Division (Indian Head)
 3d Infantry Division (Marne Division)
 4th Infantry Division (Ivy Division)
 7th Infantry Division (Bayonet Division)
 10th Mountain Division
 25th Infantry Division (Tropic Lightning)
 35th Infantry Division (Santa Fe Division)
 82d Airborne Division (All American)
 101st Airborne Division (Air Assault) (Screaming Eagles)

Brigades
 39th Infantry Brigade Combat Team (The Arkansas Brigade)

References 

 
 

Army during the War on Terrorism
War on Terrorism
War on Terrorism